The 2008–09 Ford Ranger One Day Cup is the 39th season of official List A domestic cricket in Australia. The season began on 8 October 2008 when Western Australia played,  New South Wales.

The final between the Victorian Bushrangers and the Queensland Bulls was played at the MCG on 22 February 2009.

Points Table
The top two teams after each round was played competed in the Ford Ranger One Day Cup final. The match was contested at the home ground of the side that finished first. (For an explanation of how points are rewarded, see Ford Ranger One Day Cup – Points system).

Teams

Fixture

October

November

December

January

February

Final

Statistics

Most Runs

Most Wickets

References

Domestic cricket competitions in 2008–09
Ford Ranger One Day Cup Season, 2008-09
Australian domestic limited-overs cricket tournament seasons